Thomas Jackson (9 April 1925 – 6 June 2003) was a British trade unionist and is best remembered as the General Secretary of the Union of Post Office Workers who led 200,000 members into a 47-day strike in 1971, the first national postal strike.

Jackson was born in Leeds, West Yorkshire. Aged 14 he began work for the GPO as a telegraph boy. He spent three years (1943–46) on wartime service in the Royal Navy. Upon his return, he became a postman, and later a sorter, during which time he became involved in the affairs of the Union of Post Office Workers. He became a member of its executive council in 1955 and in 1964, was elected national officer. In 1967, he became General Secretary, a role he held until 1982. He was instantly recognizable to the public for his luxuriant handlebar moustache.

Other positions held
Governor, BBC (1968–73)
Member, Annan Committee on the Future of Broadcasting (1974–77)
Member, court and council of Sussex University (1974–78)
HM Government appointed director, BP (1975–83)
Chairman, General Council of TUC (1978–79)
Chairman, TUC International Committee (1978–82)
Chairman, Ilkley Literature Festival (1984–87)

Jackson married Norma Burrow in 1947 and had one daughter, Kim. In 1982, he divorced Burrow and married Kathleen Tognarelli in the same year, a marriage which produced another daughter.

After retirement from trade union activities, he ran a second-hand book business, specializing in recipe books. He refused honours from Harold Wilson and later the offer of a peerage in James Callaghan's resignation list in 1979.
He died in Ilkley, West Yorkshire on 6 June 2003 aged 78.

References

External links
Tom Jackson: Moderate postal workers' leader whose authority never recovered from a damaging national strike (The Guardian, 07/06/2003)

1925 births
2003 deaths
General Secretaries of the Union of Communication Workers
Politicians from Leeds
Members of the General Council of the Trades Union Congress
Presidents of the Trades Union Congress
British postmen
British booksellers
Royal Navy personnel of World War II